The Ecuador national beach handball team represents Ecuador at international beach handball matches. It is governed by the Federacion Ecuatoriana de Balonmano.

World Championships results
2022 – 13th place

Other competitions
2016 Bolivarian Beach Games - 
2019 South American Beach Games - 6th place
2019 South and Central American Beach Handball Championship - 5th place
2022 South and Central American Beach Handball Championship - 4th place

Youth team results
2017 Pan American Youth Beach Handball Championship - 8th place
2022 South American Youth Games - 5th place

References

External links
IHF profile

National beach handball teams
Beach handball